Yealand or Yealands may refer to:

Yealand Redmayne, a village and civil parish in the English county of Lancashire
Yealand Storrs, a hamlet in the English county of Lancashire
Yealand Conyers. a village and civil parish in the English county of Lancashire
Yealands Estate, a winery in New Zealand